The 2020 Louisiana Tech Bulldogs baseball team represent Louisiana Tech University in the 2020 NCAA Division I baseball season. The Bulldogs play their home games at Ruston High's Baseball Stadium and are led by fourth year head coach Lane Burroughs.

On March 12, the Conference USA released an announcement proclaiming the suspension of all spring athletics until "further notice". This came during the COVID-19 pandemic.

Previous season

The Bulldogs finished 34–24 overall, and 17–13 in the conference. The Bulldogs lost their only two games in the C-USA Postseason Tournament and were not invited to any other tournament, thus ending their season.

Preseason

C-USA Coaches poll
The C-USA coaches poll was released on January 29, 2020 with the Bulldogs predicted to finish third in the conference.

Preseason All-C-USA teams

All-Team
Taylor Young – JR, Infielder
Reference:

Roster

Coaching staff

Schedule and results

{| class="toccolours" width=95% style="clear:both; margin:1.5em auto; text-align:center;"
|-
! colspan=2 style="" | 2020 Louisiana Tech Bulldogs Baseball Game Log
|-
! colspan=2 style="" | Regular Season (11-6)
|- valign="top"
|

|-
|
{| class="wikitable collapsible " style="margin:auto; width:100%; text-align:center; font-size:95%"
! colspan=12 style="padding-left:4em;" | March (3–3)
|-
! Date
! Opponent
! Rank
! Site/Stadium
! Score
! Win
! Loss
! Save
! TV
! Attendance
! Overall Record
! SEC Record
|- align="center" bgcolor="#ddffdd"
| Mar. 1 || Maine || || Ruston High Baseball Stadium || W 26–3 || Whorff (3–0) || Geoffrion (0-1) || None || || 734 || 9–3 || 
|- align="center" bgcolor="#ddffdd"
| Mar. 3 || at Sam Houston State || || Don Sanders StadiumHuntsville, TX || W 9–3 || Ouelette (1–0) || Wesneski (0–1) || None || ESPN+ || 1,175 || 10–3 ||
|- align="center" bgcolor="lightgrey"
| Mar. 4 || at Sam Houston State || || Don Sanders Stadium || colspan=8 |Game canceled
|- align="center" bgcolor="#ffdddd"
| Mar. 6 || at Wichita State || || Eck StadiumWichita, KS || L 2–6 || Hamilton (2–1) || Fincher (2–2) || None || || 1,845 || 10–4 ||
|- align="center" bgcolor="#ffdddd"
| Mar. 7 || at Wichita State || || Eck Stadium || L 3–5 || Bechtel (2–0) || Griffen (1–1) || Gifford (4) || || 2,113 || 10–5 ||
|- align="center" bgcolor="#ffdddd"
| Mar. 8 || at Wichita State || || Eck Stadium || L 9–10 || Peters (1-0) || Ouelette (1-1) || None || || 1,996 || 10–6 || 
|- align="center" bgcolor="#ddffdd"
| Mar. 10 || Southeastern Louisiana || || Ruston High Baseball Stadium || W 14–3 || Crigger (1–1) || Bozosi (0–1) || ''None || || 785 || 11-7 ||
|- align="center" bgcolor="lightgrey"
| Mar. 13 || vs. Middle Tennessee || || Smith–Wills StadiumJackson, MS ||  colspan=8 |Games suspended indefinitely
|- align="center" bgcolor="lightgrey"
| Mar. 14 || vs. Middle Tennessee || || Smith–Wills Stadium ||  colspan=8 |Games suspended indefinitely
|- align="center" bgcolor="lightgrey"
| Mar. 15 || vs. Middle Tennessee ||  || Smith–Wills Stadium||  colspan=8 |Games suspended indefinitely
|- align="center" bgcolor="lightgrey"
| Mar. 17 || at Northwestern State ||  || H. Alvin Brown–C. C. Stroud FieldNatchitoches, LA ||  colspan=8 |Games suspended indefinitely
|- align="center" bgcolor="lightgrey"
| Mar. 20 || at Western Kentucky ||  || Nick Denes FieldBowling Green, KY ||  colspan=8 |Games suspended indefinitely
|- align="center" bgcolor="lightgrey"
| Mar. 21 || at Western Kentucky ||  || Nick Denes Field ||  colspan=8 |Games suspended indefinitely
|- align="center" bgcolor="lightgrey"
| Mar. 22 || at Western Kentucky || || Nick Denes Field ||  colspan=8 |Games suspended indefinitely 
|- align="center" bgcolor="lightgrey"
| Mar. 24 || at Louisiana ||  || M. L. Tigue Moore Field at Russo Park ||  colspan=8 |Games suspended indefinitely
|- align="center" bgcolor="lightgrey"
| Mar. 27 || vs. Florida Atlantic ||  || Warhawk FieldMonroe, LA ||  colspan=8 |Games suspended indefinitely
|- align="center" bgcolor="lightgrey"
| Mar. 28 || vs. Florida Atlantic ||  || Warhawk Field ||  colspan=8 |Games suspended indefinitely
|- align="center" bgcolor="lightgrey"
| Mar. 29 || vs. Florida Atlantic ||  || Warhawk Field ||  colspan=8 |Games suspended indefinitely
|- align="center" bgcolor="lightgrey"
| Mar. 31 || at Southeastern Louisiana ||  || Pat Kenelly Diamond at Alumni FieldHammond, LA ||  colspan=8 |Games suspended indefinitely
|}
|-
|

|-
|

|-
! colspan=2 style="" | Post-Season 
|-
|

|- 
! colspan=9 | Legend:       = Win       = Loss       = Cancelled/SuspendedBold = Louisiana Tech team member
|}Schedule Source:'''
*Rankings are based on the team's current ranking in the D1Baseball poll.

References

LSU
Louisiana Tech Bulldogs baseball seasons
Louisiana Tech baseball